The Central Committee (CC) composition was elected by the 11th Congress, and sat from 2 April 1922 until 25 April 1923	. The CC 1st Plenary Session renewed the composition of the Politburo, Secretariat and the Organizational Bureau (OB) of the Russian Communist Party (Bolsheviks).

Plenums
The CC was not a permanent institution. It convened nine plenary sessions between the 11th Congress and the 12th Congress. When the CC was not in session, decision-making powers were transferred to inner bodies of the CC itself; the Politburo, Secretariat and Orgburo (none of these bodies were permanent either, but convened several times a months).

Apparatus
Individuals employed by Central Committee's bureaus, departments and newspapers made up the apparatus between the 11th Congress and the 12th Congress. The bureaus and departments were supervised by the Secretariat, and each secretary (member of the Secretariat) supervised a specific department. The leaders of departments were officially referred to as Heads, while the titles of bureau leaders varied between chairman, first secretary and secretary.

Composition

Members

Candidates

References

General

Plenary sessions, apparatus heads, ethnicity (by clicking on the individual names on "The Central Committee elected by the XI th Congress of the RCP (B) 02.04.1922 members" reference), the Central Committee full- and candidate membership, Politburo membership, Secretariat membership and Orgburo membership were taken from these sources:

Bibliography

Sources

Central Committee of the Communist Party of the Soviet Union
1922 establishments in Russia
1923 disestablishments in Russia